Monte Lake Provincial Park is a provincial park in British Columbia, Canada, located on the east side of Monte Lake and to the south of the community of Monte Lake, British Columbia which is at the north end of the lake.  About five hectares in size, it protects an area of Ponderosa pine and grasslands.

See also
Monte Creek, British Columbia

References

Provincial parks of British Columbia
Thompson Country
1956 establishments in British Columbia
Protected areas established in 1956